Robert Emmett Moore (October 22, 1849 – December 6, 1921) was an American politician who served as seventh lieutenant governor of Nebraska, from 1895-97.

He also served as 11th mayor of Lincoln, Nebraska, from 1883-85.

References

1849 births
1921 deaths
Lieutenant Governors of Nebraska
People from Clark County, Illinois